Bzowiec may refer to the following places in Poland:
Bzowiec, Lublin Voivodeship
Bzowiec, Warmian-Masurian Voivodeship
Bzówiec, Kuyavian-Pomeranian Voivodeship